Events in the year 1935 in the British Mandate of Palestine.

Incumbents
 High Commissioner – Sir Arthur Grenfell Wauchope
 Emir of Transjordan – Abdullah I bin al-Hussein
 Prime Minister of Transjordan – Ibrahim Hashem

Events

 According to official statistics there were 61,854 Jewish immigrants during 1935.
 4 January – The British open the Mosul-Haifa oil pipeline, a major oil pipeline between the Mosul oil fields in Iraq and the Mediterranean port of Haifa in Palestine.
 10 February – Nahariya is founded.
 April – Palestine Arab Party established.
 2–10 April – 2nd Maccabiah Games are held in Tel Aviv, despite British opposition.
 5–6 May – Renowned Egyptian singer Umm Kulthum performs in the Mugrabi Theater in Tel Aviv, continuing after to Jerusalem and Haifa.
 23 June – Reform Party (Palestine) established.
 16 October – Discovery of a Zionist arms shipment at the port of Jaffa leads to unrest throughout Palestine.
 20 November – Sheikh Muhammad Izz ad-Din al-Qassam, the Sunni Islamic preacher and leader of the armed organization Black Hand which used violence against Jewish civilians and the British, is killed in a gunbattle with British police forces near Jenin.

Unknown dates
 National Bloc (Palestine) established.

Births
 7 January – Noam Sheriff, Israeli composer and conductor (died 2018)
 18 January – Gad Yaacobi, Israeli minister, ambassador to the United Nations, and Labor Party Knesset member (died 2007)
 19 January – Ilan Amit, Israeli strategist, government adviser, and Mossad analyst (died 2013)
1 February – Ze'ev Almog, Israeli naval officer, former Commander in Chief of the Israeli Navy and manager of Israel Shipyards.
 17 February – Uri Ilan, Israeli soldier who committed suicide in Syrian captivity, national hero in Israel (died 1955)
 27 February – Yaakov Turner, Israeli politician, military officer, and police commander, mayor of Beersheba
 24 March – Jacob Turkel, Israeli judge, former judge on the Supreme Court of Israel
 29 March – Boaz Kofman, Israeli footballer and football manager
 2 April – Uriel Lynn, Israeli lawyer and politician
 8 April – Avi Primor, Israeli diplomat and publicist
 15 June – Shimon Even, Israeli computer scientist (died 2004)
 1 July – Shmulik Kraus, Israeli singer and actor (died 2013)
 5 July – Shevah Weiss, Israeli political scientist and politician (in Poland)
 13 July – Dan Almagor, Israeli playwright
 9 September – Chaim Topol, Israeli actor (died 2023)
 30 October – Avraham Stern, Israeli politician (died 1997)
 1 November – Edward Said, Palestinian-American literary theorist (died 2003)
 4 November – Uri Zohar, former Israeli film director, actor, and comedian who left the entertainment world to become a rabbi (died 2022).
 15 November – Mahmoud Abbas, Chairman of the Palestinian National Authority
 24 November – Shlomo Amar, Israeli politician
 15 December – Adnan Badran, former Jordanian Prime Minister
 24 December – Arnon Soffer, Israeli demographer
 Full date unknown
 Said Aburish, Palestinian Arab journalist and writer (died 2012).
 Imil Jarjoui, Palestinian Arab politician (died 2007).
 Avigdor Nebenzahl, Israeli rabbi and posek
 Moshe Levinger, Israeli rabbi and settlement activist (died 2015).
 Eitan Tchernov, Israeli conservationist (died 2002).
 David Ussishkin, Israeli archaeologist.

Deaths

 9 June – Shmaryahu Levin (born 1867), Russian (Belarus)-born rabbi and Zionist activist.
 1 September – Abraham Isaac Kook (born 1865), Russian (Latvia)-born first Ashkenazi chief rabbi of the British Mandate for Palestine.
 20 November – Izz ad-Din al-Qassam (born 1882), Syrian-born Palestinian Muslim cleric who founded and headed the militant Black Hand movement and a number of other extreme anti-Jewish and anti-British groups. He was based in Haifa and president of the Young Men's Muslim Association there.

References

 
Palestine
Years in Mandatory Palestine